The least forest mouse (Apomys musculus)  is a species of rodent in the family Muridae.
It is found only in the Philippines.

See also
List of mammals of the Philippines
Luzon montane forest mouse
Large Mindoro forest mouse
List of rodents

References

External links
 Zipcodezoo.com
 Biolib.cz
 Animaldiversity.ummz.umich.edu

Apomys
Endemic fauna of the Philippines
Rodents of the Philippines
Mammals described in 1911
Taxonomy articles created by Polbot